Magoni is an Italian surname. Notable people with the surname include:

Lara Magoni (born 1969), Italian alpine skier and politician
Paoletta Magoni (born 1964), Italian alpine skier

Italian-language surnames